The Peru First Division (First Division) —known as Liga 1 Betsson for sponsorship reasons and officially as Liga 1 — is the top flight of association football in Peru. It has been referred to as Torneo Descentralizado since 1966, when the first teams residing outside the Lima and Callao provinces were invited to compete in the inaugural league national competition.

The main sponsor is the Spanish telecommunications brand Movistar. There are 20 teams in the division of a league that operates on a system of promotion and relegation determined at the end of the season with the Segunda División and the Copa Perú. Seasons run from February to December with each team playing 44 matches. The league is organized by Asociación Deportiva de Fútbol Profesional (ADFP)

The Peruvian Football League was founded on an amateur basis and organized in 1912 into the two tiers of Primera División and the Segunda División. Editions from 1912 to 1921 were played by clubs based in Lima and Callao. In 1922 the Peruvian Football Federation (FPF) was created and in 1926 it organized its first amateur championship. The Primera División became professional in 1951. In 1966, the first true national league was founded and continues.

As of the win by current champion Alianza Lima in the 2022 season, the league championship has gone to 21 different clubs, though a majority (70 of 105 championships) have been won by just three clubs: Universitario (26), Alianza Lima (25), and Sporting Cristal (20).

History

First clubs

Football was introduced in Peru in the 19th century by British residents in Lima. The early players were British residents, British sailors that stopped at the port in Callao, or upper class Peruvians were introduced to the sport on their travels. The first recorded football match in Lima was played on 7 August 1892 between British residents and Peruvians at the club ground Santa Sofía belonging to the Lima Cricket and Lawn Tennis club. Interest in sport slowly grew among the upper class Peruvians who established clubs, such as Lima Cricket & Lawn Tennis and Regatas Lima club dedicated their sporting activities to cricket and tennis, and aquatic sports. Additional clubs would follow: Lawn Tennis club, Unión Cricket, and Unión Ciclista Lima. Football would gain a following: Unión Cricket would be the inaugural club to include football in their activities. Other clubs would follow.

Just before the turn of the 20th century, football was encouraged among students that began to hold small inter-scholastic championships. The first football club in Peru was Association FBC, founded on 20 May 1897 by students from different schools. Several other schools and students started their own football clubs. One club founded on 9 June 1902 by cricket enthusiasts from the Instituto Chalaco was Atlético Chalaco. They started to play football and become a representative team of Callao. Conversely, some educational institutions, like Universidad San Marcos would adopt a system of competition among clubs formed of faculty of each its colleges. Their competitions started as early as 1899. In time one faculty team would separate from the university to form their own independent football club, known today as Universitario. Clubs unaffiliated with educational institutions started to form. One of these clubs was Sport Alianza—today Alianza Lima—which was founded by Italians and Chinese of the working class of Lima in 1901 although their available records date from around 1912.

Creation of the Liga Peruana de Fútbol 
After a period of time of random play competition among clubs, the idea of a league and championship status developed. In 1912, club Sporting Miraflores invited several other clubs in Lima and Callao to participate in the formation of a football league. Those clubs that accepted established the la Liga Peruana de Fútbol (Peruvian Football League); teams from Callao declined the invitation. The inaugural season in 1912 established two divisions; Primera División and Segunda División. The Primera División composed of Lima Cricket, Association FBC, Miraflores, Sporting Miraflores, Jorge Chávez N°1, Escuela Militar de Chorrillos, Sport Progreso, Sport Inca and Sport Vitarte while the Segunda División composed Sport Lima, Carlos Tenaud N°1, Carlos Tenaud N°2, Atlético Grau N°1, Unión Miraflores, Libertad Barranco, Atlético Peruano y Sport Magdalena. Lima Cricket inaugurated the tournament championship title; Association finished second.

The first edition was a relative success despite some minor setbacks. For instance, Escuela Militar de Chorrillos withdrew from the tournament in the middle of the season after only have earned 1 point. The second edition of the Liga Peruana had Jorge Chávez N°1 reach the top. The following year Lima Cricket would tally a second title. Sport José Gálvez—who refused to participate in 1912—won consecutive championships in 1915 and 1916. In 1917 Sport Juan Bielovucic championed the Liga. Sport Alianza would earn its first titles in 1918 and 1919. Sport Inca and Sport Progreso won the 1920 and 1921 seasons respectively. The league ran uninterrupted for 10 seasons until La Liga Peruana de fútbol temporarily disbanded due to disagreements. Between 1922 and 1925 no championships were played.

Creation of the Federación Peruana de Fútbol 
The Peruvian Football Federation was founded in 1922 and restarted the Peruvian football league in 1926 with the addition of teams from Callao. Unfortunately, the two championships in 1926 and 1927 suffered drawback as teams withdrew from the league mid-season. Of the 11 competing teams, Sport Progreso was crowned champion. Because many clubs withdrew from the tournament, Sport Progeso only played 6 games. The following season, Alianza Lima conquered its third title; they had already won two back-to-back titles in 1918 and 1919. This season featured 8 teams. As in 1926, the league did not finish properly and Alianza Lima won after winning its 3 matches. In 1928, the federation increased the number of teams to 19 and separated them into 2 groups. 5 teams advanced to second stage where the winner was league champion. The first Clásico took place in this season. In the second stage Alianza Lima faced the newly invited Federación Universitaria. The match was a 1–0 win for Federación Universitaria and began the biggest rivalry in the history of Peruvian football. At the end of the second stage, Federación Universitaria and Alianza Lima were tied for first place which led to two extra matches between them to declare the 1928 champion. The first match was a 1–1 draw and the second was a 2–0 win for Alianza Lima.

Following a second-place finish in their first division debut, Federación Universitaria would go on to win their first title in 1929. In 1930, the federation experimented with a new format. They separated the teams in 3 groups of 4 teams. The winner of each group advanced to the championship group to define the season champion. The three finalists were Atlético Chalaco, Alianza Lima, and Federación Universitaria. Atlético Chalaco would go on to win Callao's first title. Alianza Lima won the next three seasons. In 1934, Universitario de Deportes won its second championship. In this regard, there is a controversy about the team that should have been awarded the title that year. Some argue that the champion should have been Alianza Lima, while another position maintains that the title corresponds to Universitario de Deportes. Apart from this discussion, the Peruvian Football Federation, the Professional Football Sports Association of Peru recognize Universitario as the champion of 1934. In 1935, the title would go back to Callao after Sport Boys–founded in 1927 and debuted in 1933–defeated the 4 teams it was competing against. In 1936, no championship was contested due to the participation of Peru in the Summer Olympics in Berlin. The championship returned in 1937 to be won by Sport Boys. The Peru national team that competed in Berlin was made up of mostly footballers who played in Sport Boys. One of the few exceptions was Teodoro Fernández who played for Universitario and scored 6 goals in 2 games. Deportivo Municipal, another club that would become a traditional team in Peruvian football, won its first championship in 1938 and a second in 1940 whilst Universitario a tallied four titles by winning in 1939 and 1941. Prior to 1939, teams played all other teams once in the course of the season. For the 1939, 1940, and 1941 seasons, teams played all others twice instead—a double round-robin tournament.

In 1941 the Asociación No Amateur (Non-Amateur Association) took the stand as the league's organizer and renamed the league Campeonato de Selección y Competencia. In 1942, Sport Boys won a third championship, finishing one point ahead of Deportivo Municipal. In this season, a single round-robin tournament was performed but the double round-robin returned next season. Deportivo Municipal lifted their third league trophy in 1943, and began to consolidate their place in Peruvian football. In 1944, a new champion was crowned by the name of Sucre. Universitario returned to the top after winning consecutive title between 1945 and 1946. In 1947 Atlético Chalaco won its last top flight division title. 1948 saw Alianza Lima taste glory again after trophyless seasons since their conquests between 1931 and 1934. 1949 and 1950—won by Universitario and Deportivo Municipal respectively—were the last two championships played before football would become a professional sport in Peru. Between 1946 and 1949, a triple round-robin tournament was employed until in 1950 the double round-robin system made its return. Midway through the 20th century, most of the clubs which had founded La Liga Peruana de fútbol had disappeared from the top flight and five teams had become the dominant forces in Peru; Alianza Lima, Universitario de Deportes, Deportivo Municipal, Sport Boys and Atletico Chalaco.

Professional league and Descentralizado

In 1951 the top flight of Peruvian football earned professional status and the organization of the league was handed over to the ACF or Asociación Central de Fútbol (Central Football Association). Sport Boys won the first professional championship. In next 4 years, Alianza Lima rose to conquer 3 titles in 1952, 1954 and 1955. In addition, one-time champion Sucre won a second championship in 1953. The professional era saw the rise of a new team that would rival the five dominant clubs of the amateur era. During the course of Peruvian football, Rimac-based Sporting Tabaco was a regular contender. However, in December 1955, the brewery Backus and Johnston founded Sporting Cristal to represent them in the top flight. In their debut in professional football, Sporting Cristal won their first championship in 1956. The following season, a relatively unknown club by the name of Centro Iqueño won the championship. In addition, the 1957 season employed a new tournament format. After the double round-robin stage, the 10 teams were split into 2 groups for a further 4 matches. The top 5 would play for the season title and the bottom 5 for preventing relegation. This format would be used until 1959, between 1964 and 1965 (a similar format would be employed in 1969 and 1970). Sport Boys won a fifth title in 1958 while Universitario won an eighth in 1959.

The 1960 season had a new attractive feature to Peruvian football; the champion would qualify to the newly created Copa de Campeones—today Copa Libertadores. Universitario de Deportes was the first Peruvian club to compete in the South American continental tournament after winning the 1960 season. In 1962 the ACF ended its run and the ADFP took its place as the current organizer of the league. In 1965, the runner-up would join the champion in the Copa Libertadores as CONMEBOL expanded the continental tournament. Up until 1965, only clubs based in Lima or Callao competed. Therefore, in 1966 the Asociación decided to expand the league outside Lima and Callao leading the championship to be renamed the Campeonato Descentralizado (Decentralized Championship). Atlético Grau of Piura, Melgar of Arequipa, Octavio Espinosa of Ica, and Alfonso Ugarte de Chiclín of Trujillo were the first four Peruvian clubs from the country interior to be invited to play in the top flight of Peruvian football, expanding it to 14 teams. The twist in this first Descentralizado was that only the best placed club outside Lima and Callao would remain in the first division; the other three would be relegated along with 1 Lima/Callao-based team. Miguel Grau—finished sixth—remained in the first division while Universitario was crowned first Descentralizado champion. With the new national championship, the Copa Perú was created to promote clubs outside the capital hub along with the Segunda División which promoted clubs from Lima and Callao. The first Copa Perú was played in 1967—prior to the start of the 1967 Descentralizado—returning Alfonso Ugarte de Chiclín and Octavio Espinoza to the top flight in addition to newcomer Juan Aurich of Chiclayo. Universitario would go on to win the second edition of the Torneo Descentralizado. However, in this season, only one club from the country interior was relegated instead of three.

In the Torneo Descentralizado's third edition, improvements were made by the teams outside the capital hub, also known as provincianos to denote the clubs originate from the provinces of Peru. Notably Juan Aurich of Chiclayo tied with Sporting Cristal at the end of the season for first place. The championship was to be defined in a single playoff match in the Estadio Nacional. Sporting Cristal won the playoff 2–1 but Juan Aurich, as runner-up, qualified for the Copa Libertadores, being the first provinciano to do so. In 1969, the tournament suffered a minor change in the format. The tournament was played with 14 teams, as had been since 1966, however after the first leg of the round robin matchups, the table was split into two parts, with the top 6 fighting for the national title and the bottom 8 avoiding relegation. Universitario won their third Descentralizado title totalizing thirteen Primera División titles.

In 1970, the national championship would modify the previous season's format. After the clubs played each other in a double round-robin tournament, the clubs would be separated into two groups of 7 each, then playing an additional double round-robin tournament to determine the champion. Sporting Cristal finished first obtaining their fourth league title, tying Deportivo Municipal's record. For the 1971 season, the championship was expanded to 16 teams. Universitario won the season title reaching fourteen Primera División titles, tying arch-rivals Alianza Lima in first division titles. Universitario's participation in the following season's Copa Libertadores would lead to an appearance in the continental finals against Independiente of Argentina, defeating Alianza Lima, Universidad de Chile and Unión San Felipe in the first group stage as well as defending champion Nacional and three-time champion Peñarol in the second group stage. In the first leg of the finals, they would draw in Lima 0–0 and lose 2–1 in Avellaneda. As in the 1972 Copa Libertadores, Universitario would finish second in the Descentralizado of 1972 to Sporting Cristal, tying Sport Boys 5 title record.

Starting in 1984, the regional leagues would be employed which would be a complex system which featured up to 40 teams from all over the country.

In 1997 the tournament format was modified again, this time employing a similar system being used in Argentina at the time. The general idea of the system was to divide the season into two tournaments called the Apertura and Clausura tournaments. At the end of the season the tournament winners faced in a season final for the championship title. The 1997 season did not have a final after Alianza Lima won both tournaments automatically winning the 1997 title ending an 18-season title drought. At the end of the 2008 season this format was abolished due to the lack of championship playoffs in 2007 and 2008. The 2009 season employed a new liguilla format including a regular season between 16 teams which would qualify to two groups depending on their placement at the end of the regular season. The winners of each group would dispute a two-legged final at the end of the season to determine the national champion.

In 2018 the Peruvian Football Federation announced that the league would be restructured, called "Liga de Fútbol Profesional" and organized by the national federation itself instead of the ADFP, starting with the 2019 edition.

As of 2022, Universitario, Alianza Lima and Sporting Cristal have won 26, 25 and 20 official league titles respectively. They are regarded as the Big Three of Peru. However, other teams have risen to new heights. In particular, a team from Cusco, Cienciano, has been the only Peruvian team to win international tournaments (Copa Sudamericana 2003 and Recopa Sudamericana 2004), though it has yet to win the domestic league title. Other notable teams include Melgar, Binacional, Juan Aurich and Unión Huaral, which are the only non-capital teams to have won a national championship.

Most seasons 
Below is the list of clubs that have appeared in Torneo Descentralizado since its inception in 1966 until the 2023 season. The teams in bold compete in Liga 1 currently. Alianza Lima, Sporting Cristal and Universitario are the only teams that have played in every season of Descentralizado.

 58 seasons: Alianza Lima, Sporting Cristal, Universitario
 54 seasons: Melgar
 50 seasons: Sport Boys
 44 seasons: Deportivo Municipal
 40 seasons: Cienciano
 36 seasons: Juan Aurich
 30 seasons: Alianza Atlético
 27 seasons: León de Huánuco
 24 seasons: Carlos A. Mannucci, Unión Huaral
 23 seasons: Coronel Bolognesi, UTC
 22 seasons: CNI
 19 seasons: Atlético Torino, Defensor Lima, Universidad San Martín
 18 seasons: Alfonso Ugarte, Atlético Grau
 17 seasons: Deportivo Junín
 16 seasons: Unión Minas, Universidad César Vallejo
 15 seasons: Sport Huancayo
 14 seasons: ADT, Ayacucho, Octavio Espinosa
 13 seasons: Atlético Chalaco
 12 seasons: Deportivo Wanka, José Gálvez, San Agustín
 11 seasons: Cusco
 10 seasons: Unión Comercio
 7 seasons: Cantolao, Defensor ANDA, Defensor Arica
 6 seasons: Atlético Huracán, Binacional, Diablos Rojos, Juventud La Joya, Juventud La Palma
 5 seasons: Deportivo Cañaña, Internazionale, José Pardo, Mina San Vicente, Porvenir Miraflores, Sport Áncash
 4 seasons: AELU, Alianza Universidad, Centro Iqueño, Libertad, Deportivo Hospital, Deportivo Pucallpa, Estudiantes de Medicina
 3 seasons: 15 de Septiembre, Alipio Ponce, Atlético Universidad, Aurich–Cañaña, Aurora, Ciclista Lima, Comerciantes Unidos, Deportivo SIMA, Guardia Republicana, Hungaritos Agustinos, Juvenil Los Ángeles, Mariscal Sucre, Sport Coopsol Trujillo, Total Chalaco, Unión Tarapoto
 2 seasons: Alfonso Ugarte de Chiclín, Atlético Belén, Carlos Stein, Chacarita Versalles, Chanchamayo, Cobresol, Deportivo Bancos, Deportivo Morba, Deportivo Pacífico, Deportivo Tintaya, Hijos de Yurimaguas, KDT Nacional, La Loretana, Los Espartanos, Mariscal Nieto, Rosario, San Martín de Porres, Sport Pilsen, Unión Huayllaspanca
 1 season: ADO, Alcides Vigo, Alianza Naval, Atlético Minero, Barrio Frigorífico, Carlos Concha, Defensor La Bocana, Deportivo Comercio, Deportivo Garcilaso, Deportivo Llacuabamba, IMI, Lawn Tennis, Los Caimanes, Pacífico, Pirata, Piérola, San Simón, Social Magdalena, Sport Loreto, Sportivo Huracán, Unión Pesquero, Walter Ormeño

Competition format and sponsorship
Domestic
The 2019 season will be played by 18 teams. The season will be divided into three stages: Torneo Apertura, Torneo Clausura, and the Playoffs.

The first and second stages will be two smaller Apertura and Clausura tournaments of 17 games each. Each team will play the other teams once during the Apertura tournament and once during the Clausura tournament in reversed order for a total of 34 matches. Points earned during the Apertura will not carry over during the Clausura. The winners of the Apertura and Clausura stages will qualify to the playoffs along with the top two teams of the aggregate table at the end of the season.

The playoffs to decide the national champion will be contested by four teams, which will play two semifinals with the winners playing the final. In every stage of the playoffs, the teams with the most points on the aggregate table will choose which leg they play as the home team. If the teams are tied in points after the two legs of the final, a third match on neutral ground will be played to decide the national champion. If a team wins both the Apertura and Clausura, the playoffs will not be played and that team will be declared as champion.

Qualification to international competitions will be as follows: the top four teams of the aggregate table will qualify for the Copa Libertadores, while the next four best teams in that table will qualify for the Copa Sudamericana. In case the Copa Bicentenario winners have already qualified for an international competition, the eighth best team in the aggregate table will also qualify for the Copa Sudamericana. The two teams with the fewest points in the aggregate table at the end of the season will be relegated.

A system of promotion and relegation exists between the Primera División and the Segunda División. The two lowest placed teams in Primera División are relegated to the Segunda División, and the top team from the Segunda División and Copa Perú promoted to Primera.

International
Eight teams participate in international competitions while they play the national championship. These international club fixtures take place during the week on Tuesdays, Wednesdays, and Thursdays. Peru is allotted 4 spots in the Copa Libertadores and 4 in the Copa Sudamericana.

South American qualification
South America has two international competitions played every year. For 2019, Peru will have eight berths, four in the Copa Libertadores and four in the Copa Sudamericana.

Sponsorship
The Peruvian First Division is sponsored by Movistar TV (formerly known as Cable Mágico), hence the name Copa Movistar. They have had exclusive broadcasting rights since 2000.

Rivalries
Alianza Lima – Universitario (National derby)
Alianza Lima – Sporting Cristal (Modern derby)
Sporting Cristal – Universitario (Modern derby)
Deportivo Municipal – Universitario (Modern derby)
Cienciano – Melgar (Southern derby)
Carlos A. Mannucci – Juan Aurich (Northern derby)
Cienciano – Cusco (Cusco derby)
Cienciano – Deportivo Garcilaso (Cusco derby)
Atlético Chalaco – Sport Boys (Callao derby)
Carlos A. Mannucci – Universidad César Vallejo (Trujillo derby)
Atlético Grau – Alianza Atlético (Piura derby)

Clubs

Currently, 19 clubs participate in the Liga 1, an increase of two from the 2019 season. Of these 20 clubs, only Universitario and Alianza Lima are owners of their home stadiums. The remaining 18 clubs are dependent upon the Instituto Peruano del Deporte for their local matches. 3 clubs operate as Sociedades Anónimas, the equivalent of a public limited company in the United Kingdom; these clubs are Universidad San Martín, Universidad César Vallejo and Sporting Cristal. The remaining 13 clubs operate as civil non-profit associations or asociaciónes civiles sin fines de lucro in Spanish. 7 of these clubs are from the Lima metropolitan area and the remaining clubs make up the 11 teams from the country's interior. Prior to the current 18-club Primera División, 14 teams competed in 2008, 12 between 2006 and 2007, and 16 between 2009 and 2018. In 1989 and 1990, the Primera División played with a record 44 teams.

Universitario and Alianza Lima have a clear advantage of titles won over the other clubs in Peru. Since 1912, they have won a combined total of 48 Primera División championships of the 97 seasons contested, 26 and 22 respectively. Sporting Cristal trails behind with 19 professional era titles since their debut in 1956 and further behind is the traditional Sport Boys having conquered 6 league titles. Universidad de San Martín de Porres challenged the dominance of the Big Three with back-to-back titles in 2007 and 2008 and a third in 2010. In addition, Binacional, Melgar, Juan Aurich, and Unión Huaral are the only clubs outside the metropolitan area of Lima to have won a national championship. Other noteworthy clubs to have won championships include 4-time winner Deportivo Municipal.

Universitario is the club with the longest spell in the Primera División, playing since 1928 when they debuted as Federación Universitaria and changing their name to Universitario de Deportes a few years later. They are followed by archrivals Alianza Lima who competed in the first edition of the Primera División but were relegated in 1938 and returning a year later for an uninterrupted spell since 1940. Melgar is the team with the longest run in the Primera División outside Lima, competing since 1971.

The oldest clubs currently participating in the Primera División is Alianza Lima which was founded at the beginning of the turn of the century in 1901. The newest club active in the Primera División include Binacional.

List of champions

Titles by club
There are 21 clubs who have won the Peruvian title.
Teams in bold compete in the Liga 1 as of the 2023 season.Italics indicates clubs that no longer exist or disaffiliated from the FPF.

Record players
Most Appearances

It's the top ranking the footballers than more have played in the Primera División of the Peruvian football.

Top scorers

Hat-tricks

See also
Football in Peru
Peruvian Football Federation
List of football clubs in Peru
Supercopa Peruana
Copa Bicentenario
Torneo de Promoción y Reserva
Peruvian football league system
Liga 2
Copa Perú
Ligas Departamentales
Ligas Superiores
Ligas Provinciales
Ligas Distritales

Footnotes

A.  Includes titles as "Federación Universitaria" (until 1932).
B.  Includes titles as "Sport Alianza" (Liga).
C.  Liga'' team from Lima, not to be confused with José Gálvez from Chimbote.

References

External links
Peruvian Football Federation
RSSSF

 

 
1
Top level football leagues of South America